Adolf von Becker (14 August 1831 – 23 August 1909) was a Finnish genre painter and art professor of German descent. He was one of the first Finnish artists to study in Paris, who taught many of the young artists of the Golden Age of Finnish Art.

Biography 
Becker was born in Helsinki, where he began his artistic studies at the newly founded Finnish Art Society Drawing School; he also studied law. In 1853, he completed his law degree and became a trainee at the Court of Appeals in Turku. While there, he continued to make drawing expeditions into the countryside and made the acquaintance of Robert Wilhelm Ekman, who encouraged him to study at the Royal Danish Academy of Fine Arts. He took Ekman's advice and graduated there in 1856.

In 1858, he received a recommendation to study with Thomas Couture in Paris, but was overwhelmed by the huge, cosmopolitan city and left to enroll at the Kunstakademie Düsseldorf instead. The course of study there proved to be disappointing, so he returned to Paris to try again. When Couture closed his teaching studios in 1860, Becker applied to and was accepted at the École des Beaux-Arts, where he studied with Felix-Joseph Barrias, Ernest Hébert, Leon Cogniet and Leon Bonnat.

In 1864, he travelled to Spain on a scholarship and made copies of the Old Masters in Madrid. Later, he visited Italy and, on his return to France, he rented a studio outside Paris from Alfred Wahlberg, who he had met in Düsseldorf. In 1868, he returned to Finland to take a position at the University of Helsinki drawing school; replacing the late Magnus von Wright. He was appointed a Professor there in 1879.

Private teacher
Meanwhile, in 1872, he had started his own private drawing school. He was known as a very strict teacher. Studies there were however interrupted by his frequent travels. Among his best-known students were Helene Schjerfbeck, Elin Danielson-Gambogi, Helena Westermarck and Akseli Gallen-Kallela.

As the 19th-Century drew to a close, he came under increasing criticism from the younger generation of artists for being too conservative. This came to a head at the Exposition Universelle in 1889, when the older generation, represented by Becker, Walter Runeberg and Berndt Lindholm, came into open confrontation with a younger faction led by Ville Vallgren and Albert Edelfelt.

He retired from the University in 1892 and returned to Paris. As he grew older, he found the winters there a bit too cold, so he moved to Nice in 1904. He died while vacationing in Vevey, Switzerland, aged 78.

Works

See also 
 Finnish art

References

External links 

 More paintings and drawings by Becker @ the Kansallisgalleria
 Paintings with cats by Becker @ The Great Cat

1831 births
1909 deaths
Artists from Helsinki
Finnish people of German descent
Finnish realist painters
19th-century Finnish painters
Finnish male painters
19th-century Finnish male artists